Dean Island is an Antarctic, ice-covered island,  long and  wide, lying within the Getz Ice Shelf and midway between Grant Island and Siple Island, off the coast of Marie Byrd Land.

See also
Birdwell Point
Cole Point

References
 

Islands of Marie Byrd Land